The 1968 Rugby League World Cup Final was the conclusive game of the 1968 Rugby League World Cup tournament and was played between Australia and France on 10 June 1968 at the Sydney Cricket Ground in Australia.

The final had been billed a 'debacle' following Great Britain's inexplicable loss to France in Auckland, leaving them to contest the final despite being beaten by Australia seven tries to none two days prior. Nonetheless, it attracted a then record crowd of 54,290 for a World Cup Final, though it wasn't the record World Cup attendance as the second match of the tournament between Australia and Great Britain (won 25-10 by Australia) had drawn 62,256 to the SCG, a record that would not fall until 73,631 attended the 1992 World Cup Final at Wembley Stadium.

Background

The 1968 Rugby League World Cup was the fourth staging of the Rugby League World Cup since its inauguration in 1954, and the first since the 1960 tournament. The tournament was held in the Australia and New Zealand from 25 May, culminating in the final between Australia and France on 10 June.

Australia

Scores and results list Australia's points tally first.

Australia were undefeated going into the final.

France

Scores and results list France's points tally first.

France had a 2-1 record going into the Final

Match details
Although it had been anticipated before the tournament that it would be an Australia vs Great Britain WCF, the French surprised by making the Final after defeating both New Zealand and Great Britain in the preliminary games. The match attracted a World Cup Final record crowd of 54,290.

The undefeated Australians went into the tournament decider as favourites. However, France offered stern resistance and held the Australians to only a 7–0 lead at half-time, and with quarter of an hour left were only 12–0 down before losing 20–2. It was Australia's second World Cup title.

References

See also
 Rugby League World Cup
 Australia national rugby league team
 France national rugby league team
 List of rugby league test matches at the Sydney Cricket Ground

Rugby League World Cup finals
final
Rugby league in Sydney